Bago Medaw (also known as the Buffalo Mother or Lady Buffalo; ,  or) is a Burmese nat commonly venerated in the vicinity of Bago (although worship is seen throughout Lower Burma). Bago Medaw is depicted as a maiden wearing a water buffalo skull, representing a female buffalo named Nakkarai, that nursed Prine Ashakuma, son of Thamala, the traditional founder of Hanthawaddy (now Bago). She is believed to protect the family and home, and grant wishes to those she favors.

She is believed to be a goddess of the Mon people, representing the Mon cultural identity and the history of Bago, which was once the Mon capital of Hanthawaddy.

Legend
In the year 187, King Thamala was reigning in the Hanthawaddy. The king raised his brother, Prince Wimala as the crown prince. Following that, he was sent to Taxila to study. The king promises that he will succeed the throne if he returns after studying. At the same time, King Thamala took the woman who was said to have been born inside the glowing pumpkin in the forest of Hanthawaddy and made her the chief queen with the title of "pumpkin maiden". The queen gave birth to a son named Prine Ashakuma.
 
When the crown prince returns to the country after his studies, the king neglects his promise. As a result, the crown prince became furious and killed his older brother, thereby seizing control of the throne. In the wake of his uncle's usurpation of the throne, young Prine Ashakuma was forced into exile. Having been nursed by the female buffulo named Nakkarai, the young prince was given Nakkarai as his godmother. 

One day, when Prince Ashakuma blocked the tide of the water goddess Manimekhala, the goddess became very angry and demanded that he serve her with a citation in which the prince had to cut thousands of gazelles' tails to appease her anger, and the rule was that whoever lost had to obey the winner without hesitation. 

Having been defeated by the goddess' deception, she asked him to cut off the head of the Nakkarai buffalo, which was Prince Asthakuma's godmother and had pure gold in its horn, and give it to her. In fact, the mother Nakkarai was worried that her son would be sinned, so she prayed to heaven, and was beheaded only by placing the blade on her neck instead of letting Prince Ashakuma cut it by himself. Since then, Nakkarai has become a nat, and people have started building shrines for her in almost everyone's front yard. She ruled with her own shrine and made sure that business growth was for the good of the people.

References

Burmese nats
Burmese goddesses
Burmese culture
Mon people